Kim Bong-chol (김봉철.born 16 June 1968) is a North Korean sports shooter. He competed in the men's 25 metre rapid fire pistol event at the 1992 Summer Olympics.

References

1968 births
Living people
North Korean male sport shooters
Olympic shooters of North Korea
Shooters at the 1992 Summer Olympics
Place of birth missing (living people)
Shooters at the 1990 Asian Games
Asian Games medalists in shooting
Asian Games bronze medalists for North Korea
Medalists at the 1990 Asian Games